Viacheslav Vladimirovich (1083 – 2 February 1154) was a Prince of Smolensk (1113–1125), Turov (1125–1132, 1134–1146), Pereyaslavl (1132–1134, 1142), Peresopnytsia (1146–1149), Vyshgorod (1149–1151) and Grand Prince of Kiev (1139, 1151–1154).

He was a son of Vladimir Monomakh and Gytha of Wessex. On 18 February 1139 he succeeded his brother Yaropolk II of Kiev as grand prince, but was driven out in March by Vsevolod II of Kiev. He later ruled Kiev jointly with his nephew Iziaslav II of Kiev and died not long after Iziaslav in late 1154 or early 1155 and is buried in the St. Sophia Cathedral in Kiev. His only son, Michael Viacheslavovich, had predeceased him in 1129.

See also
Primary Chronicle

1083 births
1154 deaths
Monomakhovichi family
Princes of Smolensk
Princes of Turov
Princes of Pereyaslavl
Princes of Peresopnitsa
Princes of Vyshgorod
Grand Princes of Kiev
Burials at Saint Sophia Cathedral, Kyiv
12th-century princes in Kievan Rus'
Eastern Orthodox monarchs